The Dwarf catshark, Scyliorhinus torrei, is a cat shark of the family Scyliorhinidae.

Dwarf catshark may also refer to:

Asymbolus parvus